The first season of the American political drama series Designated Survivor began airing on September 21, 2016 on ABC. The series was ordered straight to series by ABC in December 2015, with a formal announcement of 13 episodes in May 2016. Eight days after the premiere, on September 29, 2016, ABC gave the series a full season order. The series is produced by ABC Studios and The Mark Gordon Company, and is filmed in Toronto, Ontario, Canada.

The series was renewed for a second season on May 11, 2017.

Premise
On the night of the State of the Union, an explosion claims the lives of the President and everyone in the line of succession except for Secretary of Housing and Urban Development Thomas Kirkman, who had been named the designated survivor. Kirkman is immediately sworn in as president, unaware that the attack is just the beginning of what is to come.

Cast and characters

Main
 Kiefer Sutherland as President Thomas "Tom" Kirkman
 Natascha McElhone as First Lady Alexandra "Alex" Kirkman
 Adan Canto as White House Chief of Staff Aaron Shore
 Italia Ricci as Special Advisor Emily Rhodes
 LaMonica Garrett as Secret Service Agent Mike Ritter
 Tanner Buchanan as Leo Kirkman (episodes 1–13; recurring episodes 14–21)
 Kal Penn as White House Press Secretary Seth Wright
 Maggie Q as FBI Agent Hannah Wells

Recurring

Episodes

Production

Development
Designated Survivor was ordered straight to series by ABC in December 2015, with a formal announcement of 13 episodes in May 2016. A month later, ABC revealed that the series would premiere on September 21, 2016. Eight days after the premiere, on September 29, 2016, ABC gave the series a full season order.

Created by David Guggenheim, the series is executive produced by Simon Kinberg, Sutherland, Suzan Bymel, Aditya Sood, and Nick Pepper. Paul McGuigan directed the pilot episode. Amy B. Harris was set to be the showrunner in February 2016, but after the series' official pick-up in May, it was announced she would be stepping down due to creative differences, and that Jon Harmon Feldman was in talks to replace her. In July 2016, Feldman was confirmed as showrunner/executive producer. In December 2016, Jeff Melvoin was hired as showrunner, replacing the departing Feldman. Kal Penn, formerly associate director in the White House's Office of Public Engagement, serves as a consultant for the series as well as acting in the main cast.

Writing
Producers Jon Harmon Feldman and Guggenheim described the series as more than one genre, drawing inspiration from other political thriller-dramas, with Guggenheim explaining, "There is a West Wing component of a man governing and his team governing our nation at this critical time. It's also the Homeland aspect of investigating the conspiracy. It also has a House of Cards component, which is the characters and the business of government through the eyes of these characters."

Casting

Kiefer Sutherland joined the cast in December 2015, playing Tom Kirkman, the Secretary of Housing and Urban Development who suddenly becomes President. Sutherland had previously no intention of doing television again, but changed his mind after reading the first script of the series, saying, "I remember getting to the end of the script and thinking I was potentially holding the next 10 years of my life in my hands."

In February 2016, it was announced that Kal Penn, Maggie Q, Natascha McElhone, and Italia Ricci had been cast as Seth Wright, Kirkman's speech writer; Hannah, the lead FBI agent on the bombing of the Capitol; Kirkman's wife, an EEOC attorney; and Emily, Kirkman's Chief of Staff, respectively. Shortly after, Adan Canto had joined the series as Aaron Shore, the White House Deputy Chief of Staff. In early March, LaMonica Garrett joined the cast as Mike Ritter, Kirkman's Secret Service agent, and Tanner Buchanan and Mckenna Grace had been cast as Kirkman's children. 

In July 2016, Malik Yoba was announced for a recurring role as Jason Atwood, the seasoned Deputy Director of the FBI, to appear in seven episodes, while Virginia Madsen had been cast in the recurring role of Kimble Hookstraten, a conservative Congresswoman and the designated survivor for the rival political party. A month later, Ashley Zukerman joined the series in a recurring role as Peter MacLeish, an Afghan War veteran and popular third-term Congressman. In September 2016, Mykelti Williamson was cast as Admiral Chernow, a career military man and the Chairman of the Joint Chiefs of Staff. On November 4, 2016, it was announced that Mariana Klaveno had been cast for the show as the Dark-Haired Woman, a clandestine operator in league with the people behind the Capitol attack.

Reception

Critical response
Review aggregator website Rotten Tomatoes gave the first season an approval rating of 85% based on 52 reviews, with an average rating of 6.98/10. The site's critical consensus reads, "Kiefer Sutherland skillfully delivers the drama in Designated Survivor, a fast-paced, quickly engrossing escapist political action fantasy." Metacritic reported a score of 71 out of 100 based on 35 reviews, indicating "generally favorable reviews".

Terri Schwartz from IGN gave the first episode a rating of 8.0/10, saying, "Designated Survivor is a strong debut for a show that will fit well alongside Quantico and Scandal in ABC's government-set political drama lineup." Variety said that the episode "does everything it needs to, checking off the necessary boxes for the unwilling American hero-president in efficient, compelling scenes." Chuck Barney from Mercury News called the first episode "suspenseful". Writing for TV Insider, Matt Roush compared Designated Survivor with other series as he said "fall's niftiest new drama has West Wing idealism, Homeland suspense and House of Cards political intrigue in its robust and compelling DNA." Zack Handlen from The A.V. Club wrote positively about the show and the premiere, praising Sutherland's performance and commented on the symbol of Sutherland's glasses as he said, "The glasses he's wearing serve as a way to tell us this is a different kind of hero, but they're also a form of camouflage, making it easier for us to understand why so many people would underestimate this man."

The editors of TV Guide placed Designated Survivor first among the top ten picks for the most anticipated new shows of the 2016–17 season. In writer Alexander Zalben's overall review, he pointed out the keys to one of the strongest pilots he had seen so far: "Designated Survivor is the rare show that delivers on the hype, and surpasses it," and later stating "It's shocking that a show can balance all of these elements, but credit a magnetic cast that hits the ground running, a crack script that makes the first hour feel like 10 minutes and, of course, Sutherland as the anchor that keeps it all grounded." Zalben's review concluded with this recommendation: "There's a reason Designated Survivor wasn't just the top pick across all of our Editors' lists, but also on the list compiled from TVGuide.com viewers' Watchlist adds: this is a show that delivers on its premise, feels timely, and most importantly, is a ton of fun."

On the other hand, after watching the first episode of the first season, The Guardians Brian Moylan criticized the dialogue, writing in his review that "this drama needs dialogue that won’t make the citizenry’s eyeballs roll", adding that the show features "meaningless platitudes" of a "we’re going to do this my way" attitude, and concluded by writing, "All we’re left with is a really great concept without the backing of a real leader behind it." Moylan also wrote that "there’s not enough family tension for it to be a domestic drama, not enough government intrigue to make it a political show, and not enough investigation to make it a procedural." TVLines Dave Nemetz drew references between Kirkman and Jack Bauer, Kiefer Sutherland's role in drama thriller 24, writing that "Sutherland does a good job portraying Kirkman’s deep ambivalence about the situation he’s been handed. But when he has to play hardball with an Iranian ambassador, the tough talk comes too easily to him. It’s like Kirkman has been possessed by the ghost of Jack Bauer". Nemetz also questioned the series' longevity; "As compelling as Designated Survivor'''s concept is, it’s hard to see how it will sustain itself as a weekly series".

Ratings
The first episode set a record for DVR viewers with 7.67 million, surpassing the September 25, 2014, record of almost 7 million set by the pilot of How to Get Away with Murder''.

References

External links
 

2016 American television seasons
2017 American television seasons
Season 1